Tripe palms, is a cutaneous condition characterized by ridged velvety lesions on the palms resembling the lining of a cow's stomach (tripe).

It is a paraneoplastic syndrome in gastric cancer.

See also 
 Acrokeratosis paraneoplastica of Bazex
 List of cutaneous conditions
 List of cutaneous conditions associated with internal malignancy

References 

Papulosquamous hyperkeratotic cutaneous conditions